Link & Haire was a prolific architectural firm in Montana, formally established on January 1, 1906.  It designed a number of buildings that are listed on the National Register of Historic Places.

History
The Link & Haire Firm was formed by Charles Haire and J. G. Link in 1906. Link & Haire architects planned both public and private premises. Thomas Haire, who succeeded Charles S. Haire, retired in 1926. E.B. Benson, an employee, took the place of Thomas Haire.

Partner biographies
John Gustave Link was born in Bavaria on May 13, 1870, emigrating to the United States in 1887. He practiced architecture in Denver and St. Louis before relocating to Butte in 1896. He soon formed the partnership of Link & Donovan with William E. Donovan, which was dissolved in 1900. He then formed Link & Carter, with Joseph T. Carter. In 1902 Link went to Billings, a city 228 miles east of Butte, where he established the firm's second office, leaving the Butte office under Carter's supervision. After Carter departed in 1905, Link had to find a new architect to manage the Butte office. He found his man in the form of the older Charles S. Haire, a prominent Helena architect. The two men formally established their partnership on January 1, 1906, with Link in Billings and Haire in Butte. 

Upon Haire's death in 1925, his place was taken by his son, Thomas. Link departed soon after, relocating to Spokane, Washington, where he established Link & Rasque with George M. Rasque. He returned to Billings in 1926, and his firm became J. G. Link, Inc. In 1935 Link's son John G. Link, Jr. was admitted to the firm. He retired in 1936, handing the firm over fully to his sons, John and Elmer F. Link. John G. Link, Sr. died in Billings in January 1954.

Charles Sidney Haire was born in Hamilton County, Ohio, on June 4, 1857. He attended Hughes High School in Cincinnati, graduating in 1876. It was in Ohio that he studied architecture, from 1879 to 1886. He then worked as a draftsman for the Union Pacific Railroad at Pocatello, Idaho, and the Great Northern Railway in Butte, ultimately relocating to Helena in 1893, where he established his own office. Haire practiced alone until he formed a partnership with J. G. Link in January 1906.

Haire was elected to the American Institute of Architects in 1921, and died February 3, 1925, in Olympia, Washington, while en route to Montana from California. At the time of his death, his last completed work, the Montana Life Insurance Building at Helena, was regarded as his greatest.

Architectural works

Charles S. Haire, 1893-1905
 1896 - Montana State Soldiers' Home, Veterans Dr, Columbia Falls, Montana
 1899 - St. Mary of the Assumption R. C. Church, Laurin Lp Rd, Laurin, Montana
 1901 - Detention Hospital, Lewis and Clark County Hospital, 3404 Cooney Dr, Helena, Montana
 1901 - First Unitarian Church, 325 N Park Ave, Helena, Montana
 Now the Grandstreet Theatre
 1901 - Parmly Billings Memorial Library, 2822 Montana Ave, Billings, Montana
 1902 - Dillon City Library, 121 S Idaho St, Dillon, Montana
 1902 - Silver Bow County Poor Farm Hospital, 3040 Continental Dr, Butte, Montana
 1902 - Ursuline Convent of the Sacred Heart, 1411 Leighton Blvd, Miles City, Montana
 1903 - Carnegie Library, 35 N Bozeman Ave, Bozeman, Montana

Link & Donovan, 1896-1900
 1898 - Largey Flats, 405 W Broadway St, Butte, Montana
 1899 - Mountain View M. E. Church, 301 N Montana St, Butte, Montana

Link & Carter, 1900-1905
 1900 - Butte Miner Building, 69-71 W Broadway St, Butte, Montana
 Demolished
 1901 - Masonic Temple, 314 W Park St, Butte, Montana
 1901 - Thornton Hotel, 65 E Broadway St, Butte, Montana
 1902 - Billings City Hall, 2812 1st Ave N, Billings, Montana
 Demolished
 1902 - Kohrs Memorial Library, 501 Missouri Ave, Deer Lodge, Montana
 1902 - Austin North House, 622 N 29th St, Billings, Montana
 1903 - Montana Building, Louisiana Purchase Exposition, St. Louis, Missouri
 Demolished in 1904
 1904 - Ignatius D. O'Donnell House, 105 Clark Ave, Billings, Montana
 1905 - Stapleton Block, 104 N Broadway, Billings, Montana
 1906 - St. Patrick's Catholic Church, Billings, Montana (J.G. Link Project)

Link & Haire, 1906-1925
 1907 - Main Hall (West Wing), Montana State Normal School, Dillon, Montana
 1908 - Adams Hotel, 1 Main St, Lavina, Montana
 1908 - Bank of Commerce Building, 158 N 9th Ave, Forsyth, Montana
 1908 - Post Office Building, 14 N 7th St, Miles City, Montana
 1908 - Terry Grade School, Towne Ave, Terry, Montana
 1909 - Elks Building, 112 N Pattee St, Missoula, Montana
 1909 - Burr Fisher House, 712 S Willson Ave, Bozeman, Montana
 1909 -  Masonic Temple, North 28th Street and Third Avenue, Billings, Montana.
 1909 - Masonic Temple, 120—136 E Broadway Ave, Missoula, Montana
 1910 - First National Bank Building, 519 Main St, Miles City, Montana
 1910 - Holy Rosary Hospital, 310 N. Jordan Ave, Miles City, Montana
 1910 - John M. Keith House, 1110 Gerald Ave, Missoula, Montana
 1910 - Masonic Temple, 2806 3rd Ave N, Billings, Montana
 1912 - Cell Block No. 1, Montana State Prison, 925 Main St, Deer Lodge, Montana
 1912 - Granite County Courthouse, 220 N Sansome St, Philipsburg, Montana
 1913 - Carnegie Library, 314 McLeod St, Big Timber, Montana
 1913 - Rosebud County Courthouse, 1250 Main St, Forsyth, Montana
 1914 - Montana Power Building, 113-115 Broadway, Billings, Montana
 1916 - Fallon County Jail, 723 S Main St, Baker, Montana
 1916 - John C. Huntoon House, 722 W Water St, Lewistown, Montana
 1916 - Rundle Building, 208 5th St S, Glasgow, Montana
 1916 - St. Leo's R. C. Church, 124 W Broadway, Lewistown, Montana
 1919 - Algeria Shrine Temple, 340 Neill Ave, Helena, Montana
 1921 - Mausoleum at the Mountview cemetery, Billings, Montana.
 1923 - Montana Life Insurance Building, 404 Fuller Ave, Helena, Montana
 1923 - Sundance School, 108 N 4th St, Sundance, Wyoming
 1924 - Renovations to Lake Hotel, Yellowstone National Park. (Grand Lady of the Lake: The Remarkable Legacy of Yellowstone's Lake Hotel By Michelle Tappen)
1924 - Machine Shop and Storage Garage, Yellowstone National Park, Gardiner, Montana

Link & Rasque, 1925-1926
 1926 - Benton County Courthouse, 620 Market St, Prosser, Washington

J. G. Link, Inc., 1926-1935
 1927 - Richland County Courthouse, 201 W Main St, Sidney, Montana
 1931 - Jackson County Courthouse, 10 S Oakdale Ave, Medford, Oregon
 1932 - Administration Building, Montana State Prison, 925 Main St, Deer Lodge, Montana
 1935 - Industrial Building, Montana State Prison, 925 Main St, Deer Lodge, Montana

J. G. Link & Son Company, 1935-1936
 1935 - Nurses' Home, St. Luke's Hospital, 1000 Fountain Ter Dr, Lewistown, Montana
 1936 - Washakie County Courthouse, 1000 Big Horn Ave, Worland, Wyoming

J. G. Link & Company, from 1936
 1936 - Big Horn County Courthouse, 121 3rd St W, Hardin, Montana
 1937 - Main Building, Lewis and Clark County Hospital, 3404 Cooney Dr, Helena, Montana
 1939 - Musselshell County Courthouse, 506 Main St, Roundup, Montana
 1946 - Billings Gas Building, 2603 2nd Ave N, Billings, Montana
 Demolished
 1948 - St. Jude Thaddeus R. C. School, 430 7th Ave, Havre, Montana
 1949 - Butte Civic Center, 1340 Harrison Ave, Butte, Montana
 1949 - Custer County Courthouse, 1010 Main St, Miles City, Montana
 1949 - McCone County Courthouse, 1004 C Ave, Circle, Montana
 1950 - Granite County Hospital, 310 S Sansome St, Philipsburg, Montana
 1951 - Education Building, Eastern Montana College, Billings, Montana
 Demolished in the 1980s
 1954 - A. J. M. Johnson Hall, Montana State University, Bozeman, Montana
 1954 - North and South Dormitories, Montana Training School, Boulder, Montana
 1961 - Dawson County Courthouse, 207 W Bell St, Glendive, Montana
 1962 - U. S. Federal Building (Old), 316 N 26th St, Billings, Montana

References

Companies based in Montana
Architecture firms based in Montana